Pogonoperca punctata, the spotted soapfish, bearded soapfish or leaflip grouper is a species of marine ray-finned fish, related to the groupers and classified within the subfamily Epinephelinae of the family Serranidae. It is found in the western Indo-Pacific region.

Description

Pogonoperca punctata has 7 spines in its dorsal fin and 12-13 soft rays with 3 spines and 8 soft rays in the anal fin. The brown body is covered in small white spots, and there is a black vertical bar which runs through the eye and four black saddle-like blotches along the back. There is flap of skin on the lower jaw. The juveniles have large white spots, which remain part of the patterns as adults but become increasingly obscured by smaller small white spots appearing in the grey coloured regions of the body as the fish matures. The fins are transparent.

Distribution
Pogonoperca punctata is found in the western Indo-Pacific from eastern Indonesia east to the Line Islands, Marquesas and the Society Islands, north as far as southern Japan and south to New Caledonia and islands off northern Australia, these being Evans Shoal in the Northern Territory and the eastern Indian Ocean Australian territories of Christmas Island and the Cocos (Keeling) Islands.

Habitat and biology
It prefers large coral heads on slopes where there is a moderate current, adults are usually deeper than  while juveniles occur in shallower more sheltered waters such as lagoons and bays. They are nocturnal hunters feeding on benthic crustaceans and smaller fishes. The juveniles are mimics of venomous blennies. They secrete the toxin grammistin in their skin and, like other soapfish. may do so when stressed.

Taxonomy
Pogonoperca punctata was first formally described as Grammistes punctatus in 1830 by the French zoologist Achille Valenciennes (1794-1865) with the type locality given as Vanikoro Island in the Santa Cruz Islands of the Solomon Islands.

Utlisation
Pogonoperca punctata appears in the aquarium trade. It occasionally appears in fish markets.

References

Further reading
Baissac, J. de B. (1990) SWIOP/WP/54 - Checklist of the marine fishes of Mauritius., RAF/87/008/WP/54/90 Regional Project for the Development & Management of Fisheries in the Southwest Indian Ocean.
Cuvier, G. & A. Valenciennes. 1830. Historie naturelle des poissons. Tome Sixieme. Livre sixieme. Partie I. Des Sparoides; Partie II. Des Ménides. Historie naturelle des poissons. Tome Sixieme. v. 6: i-xxiv + 6 pp. + 1–559, Pls. 141–169.
Dennis King & Valda Fraser - The Reef Guide: Fishes, corals, nudibranchs & other invertebrates: East & South Coasts of Southern Africa. Struik Nature. 2014 
Fricke, R. (1999) Fishes of the Mascarene Islands (Réunion, Mauritius, Rodriguez): an annotated checklist, with descriptions of new species., Koeltz Scientific Books, Koenigstein, Theses Zoologicae, Vol. 31:759 p.
Myers, R.F., 1991. Micronesian reef fishes. Second Ed. Coral Graphics, Barrigada, Guam. 298 p

External links
 

punctata
Fish described in 1830